John Wells (July 1, 1817 – May 30, 1877) was a United States representative from New York.  He was born in Johnstown on July 1, 1817.  He attended Johnstown Academy, and graduated from Union College in 1835. He studied law, was admitted to the bar, and commenced practice in Palmyra.  He returned to Johnstown and continued the practice of law, was elected judge of Fulton County and served from June 1847 until his resignation in December 1851, having been elected to Congress.

Wells was elected as a Whig to the Thirty-second Congress (March 4, 1851 – March 3, 1853).  He declined to be a candidate for reelection in 1852 to the Thirty-third Congress, resumed the practice of law and also engaged in literary pursuits.  He died in Johnstown on May 30, 1877, with interment in Johnstown Cemetery.

References

1817 births
1877 deaths
Union College (New York) alumni
Whig Party members of the United States House of Representatives from New York (state)
People from Palmyra, New York
19th-century American politicians